LinkUS is a transportation initiative in Central Ohio, United States. The project aims to create approximately five rapid transit corridors to support the metro population of Columbus, the capital and largest city in Ohio.

The initiative was announced in 2020 to create high-capacity rapid transit in Central Ohio. The initiative is a collaboration between the Central Ohio Transit Authority (COTA), the City of Columbus, and the Mid-Ohio Regional Planning Commission. The initiative will also aim to create jobs as well as transit-oriented developments. It will begin its focus on Columbus's northwest corridor, and then to an east–west corridor consisting of Broad and Main Streets. City officials aim for projects like Indianapolis's Red Line (a bus rapid transit line).

Northwest Corridor
The first bus rapid transit line, the Northwest Corridor, will be built on Olentangy River Road, which follows the Olentangy River northwest from the Arena District and Downtown Columbus. In Downtown Columbus, it will follow Long and Spring Streets to the COTA Transit Terminal on Rich Street. The route connects numerous medical offices, corporate buildings, and entertainment centers. Notable among these are OhioHealth, the Ohio State University, Lennox Town Center, and the Astor Park development by Lower.com Field. The route may also connect to Dublin, Ohio.

As opposed to the CMAX bus service, the bus line will aim for "true" bus rapid transit amenities, including dedicated traffic lanes, pedestrian-friendly features, and shelters with fare machines for fast boarding.

Federal funding was announced for the northwest and east–west corridors in November 2020, to be released in 2023 and 2024.

In February 2021, after considering light rail and BRT for the rapid transit route, LinkUS chose BRT. It cited a lower construction and operation cost while maintaining many benefits of light rail.

In June 2021, the design process started as the city approved a $4.5 million contract to TransSystems Corp.; $3.75 million of this is from COTA and the rest is contributed by the city. COTA and city officials want construction on the line to start by the end of the decade; first they will apply for federal funds, a process that can take years.

See also
 List of bus rapid transit systems in the Americas
 List of transport megaprojects

References

External links
 

Bus rapid transit in Ohio
Central Ohio Transit Authority
Transportation in Columbus, Ohio